A list of films produced in the Tamil film industry in India in 1945.

1945

References 

Tamil films
Lists of 1945 films by country or language
1945
1940s Tamil-language films